Simone Anne Marie Badal-McCreath is a Jamaican chemist and cancer researcher. In 2014 she was one of five women awarded the Elsevier Foundation Award for Early Career Scientists in the Developing World for her creation of a lab at the Natural Products Institute to research the anti-cancer properties of natural Jamaican products. She currently lectures in Basic Medical Sciences at the University of the West Indies (UWI) in Mona, Jamaica.

Early life
Growing up the daughter of a shop keeper in a family where no one had attended college, she intended to study medicine. Her science education was held back by a lack of teachers in her local school and it was once she reached university that she decided to be a researcher.

Authorship
Along with Rupika Delgoda, she is the co-author of the textbook Pharmacognosy: Fundamentals, Application and Strategy. She is currently writing her first book, A Woman's Journey to Success.

Career
Badal-McCreath's work is currently focused on investigating isolates of Jamaican plants which may contain anti-cancer properties, and isolating a unique Jamaican cell line, to counteract the dominance of Caucasian cell dominance in research. More specifically, Badal-McCreath and her colleagues isolated the compounds in a common seaweed called Cympolia barbata and tested them in human cells. 

She aims to market her products eventually, leading her to pursue a Masters of Business Administration (MBA) at the University of Wales, Cardiff. She believes that the ultimate goal of scientific research is for it to be able to make money and contribute to society."Knowledge is power.... accumulating as much data as you can and publishing these in peer reviewed journals contributes significantly to future research." - Simone Badal-McCreath, 2014.

References 

Living people
Cancer researchers
Jamaican chemists
Jamaican women chemists
University of the West Indies academics
University of the West Indies alumni
Alumni of the University of Wales
Year of birth missing (living people)